Athelstan Jasper Blaxland (14 September 1880 – 7 December 1963) was an English physician, beginning his career as a general practitioner in Norwich and later becoming a consultant general surgeon at the Norfolk and Norwich Hospital. He was elected as a Fellow of the Royal College of Surgeons.

During the First World War, he served with the Royal Army Medical Corps on active service in France.

Life
Blaxland was born in 1880, the only son of William Athelstan Blaxland, solicitor to London County Council, and was educated at Westminster School and University College Hospital. After graduating, his house appointments were at UCH, the Great Ormond Street Hospital, and the Royal National Hospital, and then for more than a year at the Norfolk and Norwich Hospital.
In 1907 he joined an uncle who was in general practice in Norwich.

In 1909, Blaxland became an assistant surgeon at the Norfolk and Norwich Hospital, but he went on working as a general practitioner. In 1911, he moved into 29, Surrey Street, Norwich, a large Georgian property, from where his general practice was run. Then came the outbreak of the First World War in August 1914, and in March 1915 Blaxland was commissioned into the Royal Army Medical Corps as a temporary Captain, serving mostly in France as a clearing station surgeon, treating battle casualties. After his return to Norfolk at the end of the European war, Blaxland gave up general practice, building up a practice as a consulting surgeon.

In 1925, he was appointed as a full surgeon to the Norfolk and Norwich Hospital, where in 1927 Geoffrey Gillam became his house surgeon. In 1930/1931 he was elected as President of the Norfolk branch of the British Medical Association, and he also became a Vice-President of the Medical Defence Union.

He retired in 1946, when his portrait was painted by Faith K. Sage for the Hospital. This is now at the Norfolk and Norwich University Hospital

Private life

In 1912, Blaxland married Marion Andrews, at Henstead, Suffolk, and they had four sons, Mark, John, Gregory, and Stephen, of whom Mark died at the age of two. In 1928 the Blaxlands took up residence at St Catherine's Close, All Saints Green, Norwich. One son followed his father into the medical profession.

Jasper Blaxland played tennis and golf and also enjoyed shooting. He died in 1963 in a nursing home in Norwich, and his funeral was in Norwich Cathedral. An obituary called him "unorthodox... altogether a whimsical but lovable character."

Degrees
MB & BS (London), 1904
MRCS, 11 February 1904
FRCS, 10 December 1908
MS, 1908

Notes

1880 births
1963 deaths
20th-century British medical doctors
20th-century surgeons
Alumni of the UCL Medical School
British Army personnel of World War I
British general practitioners
British surgeons
Fellows of the Royal College of Surgeons
Medical doctors from London
Military personnel from Norwich
People educated at Westminster School, London
Royal Army Medical Corps officers